Elbridge Rust Dam (April 4, 1885 – June 22, 1930) was a former Major League Baseball player. He played one game with the Boston Doves on August 23, 1909, going 1-for-2 with a double and a walk in three plate appearances.

References

External links

Boston Doves players
1885 births
1930 deaths
Baseball players from Massachusetts
Major League Baseball outfielders
Worcester Busters players
Lowell Tigers players
Lynn Shoemakers players
Brockton Shoemakers players